Man At Forty (Simplified Chinese: 跑吧!男人) was a Singaporean television drama series that revolved around a pair of brothers, one born with a silver spoon and the other having to live in poverty almost all his life, and how their lives were thrown into a roller-coaster ride by a sudden change in wealth and status. Things grew more complicated as jealousy, complacency, resentment, hatred and disillusion set in. This series was broadcast in 2004.

Cast
Zoe Tay - Jian Jie
Edmund Chen - Chen Longwei
Phyllis Quek - Xiao Tian Tian
Chen Hanwei - Chen Longhui
Andrew Seow - Tang Tang
Carole Lin - Fried Chicken
Chen Tianwen - Wang Shaoqi
Richard Low - Bao Qingtian
Jin Yinji - Jian Jie's mother
Li Yinzhu - Wang Bi-er
Chen Shucheng - Chen Yaozu
Joey Swee - Lucy
Brandon Wong - Ah Wei

Story
Edmund Chen plays Chen Long Wei, a typical rich man's son. As a result of his father's wealth, Long Wei is arrogant and does not see the need to work hard for his future. On the other hand, his brother, Long Hui (Chen Hanwei) is an illegitimate child who lives with his mother without all the privileges that Long Wei has since birth.

The Chen family has been running the famous 'Kang Ji' traditional bun business for three generation. Because of Long Wei's attitude in life, his father is worried that he will destroy the family business should he inherit it thus he bequeathed his business to Long Hui instead. Unable to deal with the fact that his father did not pass on the business to him, Long Wei sells his shares to the business and continues to lead a spendthrift and aimless life.

Fear of losing his girlfriend, Tian Tian (Phyllis Quek), Long Wei decides to pull himself together and prove to her that he can be a man of achievements. However, the jealous Long Hui steps in to destroy Long Wei's confidence. Dejected, Long Wei reverts to his old ways. Fortunately, Long Wei has two good friends; Tang Tang (Andrew Seow) and Jian Jie (Zoe Tay) who never give up on him. In fact, it is Jian Jie, a simple woman with a sad past who eventually persuaded Long Wei to turn over a new leaf and learn the skill to make buns so that he can start afresh.

Long Hui with his newfound wealth begins to become obnoxious, arrogant and takes on the same path that Long Wei has gone through. Losing enthusiasm for work, his business suffers and the shop is taken over by the bank. But then they both realized that they should forgive each other cause it is also for the sake of their father and their family.

Awards & Nominations

2004 Singaporean television series debuts
2004 Singaporean television series endings
Singapore Chinese dramas
Channel 8 (Singapore) original programming